Heath Creek Township is an inactive township in Pettis County, in the U.S. state of Missouri.

Heath Creek Township was erected in 1844, taking its name from Heaths Creek.

References

Townships in Missouri
Townships in Pettis County, Missouri